The Anglican Diocese of Idoani is one of twelve within the Anglican Province of Ondo, itself one of 14 provinces within the Church of Nigeria: the current bishop is Adegoke Oludare Agara; he was consecrated a bishop on 21 September 2020 at the Cathedral Church of the Advent, Abuja.

References

Church of Nigeria dioceses
Dioceses of the Province of Ondo